Carcinops is a genus of clown beetles in the family Histeridae. There are at least 50 described species in Carcinops.

Species

References

Further reading

 
 
 

Histeridae